Pia Marjaana Lohikoski is a Finnish politician currently serving in the Parliament of Finland for the Left Alliance at the Uusimaa constituency. She was first elected to office in 2019.

References

Living people
Members of the Parliament of Finland (2019–23)
Left Alliance (Finland) politicians
21st-century Finnish politicians
21st-century Finnish women politicians
Women members of the Parliament of Finland
Year of birth missing (living people)